Tamatha-Kaye Erin Paul (born 1997) is a New Zealand activist and politician who currently serves in the Wellington City Council for the Pukehīnau Lambton Ward. In 2018 she was the first Māori woman to be elected President of the Victoria University of Wellington Students Association. Running as an independent Paul was elected to the city council in 2019. She joined the Green Party of Aotearoa New Zealand ahead of the 2022 elections.

Early life and education 
Paul was born in South Auckland in 1997 and lived in Christchurch until moving at age eight with her family to the agricultural town of Tokoroa. She is of Māori and European descent, with her father of Waikato Tainui and Ngāti Awa origin, while her mother is of English, Scottish and Spanish genealogy. Paul attended school in Tokoroa and achieved dux of Tokoroa High School in 2015. At age 12, Paul was diagnosed as the youngest person in the Waikato region with the autoimmune disease lupus.

Paul received a $30,000  ‘First in Family’ scholarship from Victoria University of Wellington, and in 2018, she graduated with a Bachelor of Arts in international relations and political science. Paul also received the Andrea Brander Accommodation Scholarship, the James MacIntosh Scholarship for achievement, and was on the Dean’s List for Academic Excellence. Paul is currently studying a Master of Resource and Environmental Planning at Massey University, and resides in Aro Valley, Wellington.

Political career

Victoria University of Wellington Students' Association 
In 2016, Paul was elected as Equity Officer of the Victoria University of Wellington Students' Association (VUWSA), and in 2017, she was elected Engagement Vice-President. In 2018, Paul was elected to the position of President of VUWSA. Paul was the second Māori and first female Māori to be elected to the role. During her time as president, Paul worked on the issues of climate change, sexual violence and mental health, and achieved extra mental health and counselling services for students at Victoria University of Wellington.

Wellington City Council 
 In the 2019 Wellington local elections, Paul was elected to the Wellington City Council in the Pukehīnau/Lambton Ward. Paul campaigned on issues such as environmental policy, representation for minority and youth communities, and an aspiration for a living wage policy. Paul says she was inspired by Chlöe Swarbrick and her Auckland mayoral campaign in 2016.

Paul was considered part of a 'youthquake', a movement of young people in New Zealand running for local government, in 2019. This included six Wellingtonians under 25 running campaigns for local councils. Swarbrick expressed support for these campaigns.

In 2020, Paul told Stuff that a run for the mayoralty was “definitely something that I’m thinking about”. Though she said she had been frustrated during at realising the lack of power the council had to make significant changes, so was unsure if a run for mayor would make any difference. “It frustrates me how little resource and decision-making power we have to deliver for Wellingtonians in areas like climate change, housing and transport ... There are more ambitious and aspirational things I wanted to be able to do on the council.” She ultimately declined to run for the 2022 mayoral election.

In April 2022, ahead of the 2022 Wellington local elections, incumbent Green councillor Iona Pannett was not reselected for the party's candidacy for the Pukehīnau/Lambton Ward election. In May, Paul announced that she had joined the Green Party and was seeking selection as the party's candidate for the ward, which she received in June. Paul was re-elected as city councillor for Pukehīnau/Lambton Ward in 2022.

Parliamentary campaign
In 2023, Paul announced she was seeking party selection for the parliamentary electorate of Wellington Central after both incumbent MP Grant Robertson and Green co-leader and previous party candidate James Shaw announced they would not run for the electorate in 2023.

Political positions 
Paul cites activist Tame Iti and activist and musician Tigilau Ness as childhood inspirations, and Pania Newton as a contemporary influence.

Housing 
Paul supports housing density and making housing available to all. She opposed the proposed protections of neighbourhood character in the 2021 Wellington spatial plan debate. In November 2020, Paul caused some degree of controversy due to a reply to a video response by a group of Mount Victoria residents regarding the Wellington City Council's draft spatial plan.

Environmental issues
Paul supports greater public investment in sustainable transport and renewable energy. She opposes the proposed runway extension at Wellington Airport.

Royal gun salute and Waitangi Day 
In February 2021, Paul opposed the timing of a 21-gun salute in honour of the Queen of New Zealand, Elizabeth II, due to it taking place on the same day as Waitangi Day.

See also 

 Victoria University of Wellington Students' Association
 Wellington City Council

References

External links 
 
 Wellington City Council
 
 
 

1997 births
Living people
Victoria University of Wellington alumni
Wellington City Councillors
21st-century New Zealand women politicians
Green Party of Aotearoa New Zealand politicians
Politicians from Wellington City
Victoria University of Wellington Students' Association presidents
New Zealand Māori women
People educated at Tokoroa High School
Ngāti Awa people
Waikato Tainui people